The 23rd Central American and Caribbean Games were held in Barranquilla, Colombia.

Bidding process 
Quetzaltenango was the only city to meet CACSO's January 2012 deadline to bid for the Games, and on October 29, 2012 it was named the host city.

Guatemala last hosted the Games in 1950 (in Guatemala City); Central America last hosted in 2002 (in San Salvador, El Salvador). Panajachel would be the venue for sailing, open water swimming and triathlon. Quetzaltenango was officially stripped from its hosting rights in May 2014.

Meanwhile, the Colombian City of Santiago de Cali has sent a formal request to the CACSO committee to host the 2018 Central American and Caribbean Games (due to the success of the 2013 World Games) in case that Quetzaltenango was unable to meet with the event's logistics. In addition, sports venues in Santiago de Cali were completely built and in excellent condition, while Quetzaltenango was having delays in its venue preparation.

A second bidding phase was opened to find the new hosts for the Games. Panama City (Panama), Puerto la Cruz (Venezuela), and Barranquilla (Colombia) were bidding to host the Games. Barranquilla was voted as the hosts for the Games during a CACSO meeting in Veracruz, Mexico.

Sports

Medal table

Nations
The following 37 nations took part. For the first time in the Central American and Caribbean Games, six Caribbean territories of European Countries competed, having reached agreement with ODACABE. These territories being: the three French territories of 
Guadeloupe, Martinique, and French Guiana, the British Territory of Turks and Caicos, and the two Dutch territories of Curaçao and Sint Maarten.

The numbers in parentheses represents the number of athletes entered.

References 

 
Central American and Caribbean Games
Central American and Caribbean Games
Central American and Caribbean Games
Central American and Caribbean Games
Central American and Caribbean Games
International sports competitions hosted by Colombia
Multi-sport events in Colombia
Sport in Barranquilla
July 2018 sports events in South America
August 2018 sports events in South America
Qualification tournaments for the 2019 Pan American Games
21st century in Barranquilla